Go Forth is the third album by Les Savy Fav, released in 2001 via Frenchkiss Records. It was mixed in June 2001 at Magic Shop, Manhattan, and was mastered by John Loder at Abbey Road Studios, London.

Track listing
"Tragic Monsters" – 3:14
"Reprobate's Resumé" – 3:04
"Crawling Can Be Beautiful" – 3:00
"Disco Drive" – 4:05
"The Slip" – 2:54
"Daily Dares" – 3:08
"One to Three" – 2:48
"Pills" – 3:29
"Adopduction" – 3:26
"No Sleeves" – 4:06
"Bloom on Demand" – 6:35
"I Hope You Like This-Love LSF" – 2:56

Personnel
All songs by Les Savy Fav:
Tim Harrington – vocals
Syd Butler – bass
Seth Jabour – guitar
Harrison Hayes – drums

Additional personnel
Produced and Engineered by Phil Ek
Mastered by John Loder

References

2001 albums
Les Savy Fav albums
Albums produced by Phil Ek
Frenchkiss Records albums